The Davies shadow ministry is the shadow ministry lead by Mia Davies in the Parliament of Western Australia.

Ministry
Following the 2021 election, the Liberal Party and Nationals Party entered into a formal alliance to form opposition, with National Party being the senior party and the Liberal Party being the junior party in the alliance. Shadow ministerial positions were also held by parliamentary members of both parties. This was similar to the agreements between both parties when they were in government following the 2008 and 2013 elections. Similar to the 2008 and 2013 agreements, the deputy leader of the senior party, Nationals deputy leader Shane Love, was the deputy opposition leader, instead of the leader of the junior party, Liberal Party leader David Honey. Under the alliance, each party maintained their independence, and could speak out on issues when there was a disagreement with their partner.

Former members
Vince Catania and James Hayward were members of the Shadow Cabinet following the 2021 election. In December 2021, Hayward resigned from the National Party following him being charged with child sex offences. In June 2022, Catania announced his intention to resign from parliament in August to spend more time with his family. He tendered his resignation to the speaker on 8 August.

See also
 Opposition (Australia)
 Leader of the Opposition (Western Australia)

References

External links
 Office of the Opposition Alliance

Politics of Western Australia